The Biak whistler (Pachycephala melanorhyncha) is a species of bird in the family Pachycephalidae. It is endemic to Biak in Indonesia.

References

Biak whistler
Birds of the Schouten Islands
Biak whistler